Exeter Quay, also known as Exeter Quayside, is a part of the city of Exeter next to the River Exe and the Exeter Ship Canal. It was first used as a port in prehistoric times when a sandstone ledge was used to unload the ships of overseas traders. However, by 1381 the Countess Weir had blocked the river to shipping. In 1566 a canal was completed  to provide access for ships. Over time the number of ships using the quayside increased and so the quay was expanded in  the late 17th century. Further expansion occurred in 1830 when a new canal basin was dug. However, in 1840 the railways reached Exeter and the shipping began to decline. No longer used for shipping, the quayside is now mostly used for leisure included in the links below.

A manually operated cable ferry known as the Butts Ferry crosses the Exe at Exeter Quayside.

Events 

The following is a list of events that Quay hosts every year: Dragon Boat Racing, Canoe shows and races, Exeter Street Food Night Markets, Quayside Red Coat Guided Tours, Inside Outside Summer Craft Fair, and the Exe Descent.

External links 

 Exeter Canal & Quay Trust website
 Exeter Quayside website

References 

Exeter
Ports and harbours of Devon
Tourist attractions in Exeter
Industrial archaeological sites in Devon